Elena Alekseyevna Batalova (born 27 August 1964) is a Russian freestyle skier. 

She won a gold medal in ski ballet at the FIS Freestyle World Ski Championships 1995 in La Clusaz. She also competed at the 1991, 1993, 1997 and 1999 world championships.

References

External links 
 

1964 births
Living people
Russian female freestyle skiers
20th-century Russian women
21st-century Russian women